The Campbell Fighting Camels college football team represents Campbell University in the Big South Conference. The Fighting Camels currently compete as a member of the National Collegiate Athletic Association (NCAA) Division I Football Championship Subdivision. The program has had 2 different head coaches since it began play during the 2008 season.

Campbell has played 159 games over 15 seasons, appearing in no bowl games and earning no postseason appearances.

Key

Coaches

Source

Notes

References

Lists of college football head coaches

North Carolina sports-related lists